The Edward Taylor McConnell House is a historic house at 302 South Fulton Street in Clarksville, Arkansas.  It is a two-story wood-frame structure, built in 1869 for use as a school and Masonic lodge.  It was enlarged in 1876 for conversion to a private residence, and given Folk Victorian style, notably in the delicate spindlework of its front porch.  The latter work was done for Edward Taylor McConnell, a prominent local businessman and figure in the Brooks-Baxter War.

The house was listed on the National Register of Historic Places in 2001.

See also
National Register of Historic Places listings in Johnson County, Arkansas

References

Houses on the National Register of Historic Places in Arkansas
National Register of Historic Places in Johnson County, Arkansas
Houses completed in 1869
Buildings and structures in Johnson County, Arkansas